WNGC (106.1 FM) is a Cox Media Group radio station in North Georgia that plays country music; it was at 95.5 from 1968-1999. Its city of license is Arcade with studios in Athens.  Its transmitter is in Lula, Georgia.

Station history
Prior to December 1996, 106.1 was light rock Mix 106 before switching to country and calling itself "South 106". In the spring of 1999, WSTE built a new tower because at the time they were still in competition with WNGC---just before the two stations would merge. The purpose of the deal was to try to reach a larger audience and give the two Atlanta country stations WKHX "Kicks" 101.5, and WYAY (Y106 at 106.7) some competition.The studios had moved from Toccoa to Gainesville and finally to Athens, but its signal was hard to pick up in the Atlanta area beyond Gwinnett.

While WNGC's city of license is Arcade, the transmitter is located in Lula (in northern Hall County). WNGC's 106.1 signal can be heard in northeast metro Atlanta, Greenville, South Carolina, and as far as Asheville, North Carolina, but the main coverage area is northeast Georgia and the Athens metro area (where the studios are located). Attempts were made in 2001 to move the transmitter to Sugar Hill, but those plans were scrapped.In July 2005 WNGC added former Kicks 101.5 morning host Moby and his syndicated morning show.

In January 2008, it was announced that WNGC was sold (along with sister stations WGMG, WPUP, WRFC, and WGAU) to Cox Radio in Atlanta. On March 7, 2008, WNGC started running ads inviting former Eagle 106.7 listeners to switch to 106.1 WNGC, as WYAY had become an oldies station. In February 2009, WNGC became an affiliate of the Motor Racing Network (MRN) and the Performance Racing Network (PRN), and began carrying coverage of NASCAR Sprint Cup Series racing on weekends.

On June 29, 2015, WNGC began simulcasting on WTSH-FM, rebranding as "106.1/107.1 Your Georgia Country".

On September 24, 2018, WNGC ended the simulcast with WTSH-FM, which switched to a simulcast of regional Mexican-formatted WLKQ 102.3 FM Buford.

Callsigns for 106.1
WLET  1978-1985
WZLI  1985-1992
WLET  1992-1997
WSTE  1997-1999
WNGC  1999-Now

Previous frequencies for WNGC
95.5 (as WGAU-FM 1962-1968, WNGC 1968-1999)
102.5 (as WGAU-FM 1957-1962)
99.5 (as WGAU-FM 1948-1957)

Former air staff
Sabrina Gibbons, former Program Director and On Air Personality, is currently Midday News Anchor on WSB AM750/WSBB-FM 95.5 in Atlanta
Tim Cicciarelli, former Morning Show Host, now runs a video production company in Athens
Scott Howard, former Sports Director and Morning Show Sidekick, became The Voice of the Georgia Bulldogs after Larry Munson retired
Kevin Steele, former Program Director, now Air Personality at WKHX, Atlanta.
George Mason Dixon, former Afternoon Show Host, retired from WDUN in 2011
Mike Wooten, former News Director, left to become spokesman for the Clarke County School District and is now Operations Manager at WRGC Radio at Georgia College and State University in Milledgeville 
Paul Rea, former host of The Paul Rea Midday is News Director for multiple stations in the Oconee River Broadcasting Group 
Deborah Reece, former On Air Announcer, is now the Afternoon Show Host on Kiss 104.1 FM Atlanta
Jeff Batten, former On Air Announcer, now owns North Georgia stations WJBB 107.1, WCHM 96.7, WJUL 97.7 and WJRB 95.1

The Georgia Bulldogs
WNGC-FM is one of many stations that carry The University of Georgia football games (along with sister WRFC), something it has done since 1991. Until 2005 WNGC was also the home of UGA men's basketball, which can now be heard on sister station WRFC and on 103.7, Chuck FM.

Previous logo
 (WNGC's logo under previous simulcast with WTSH)

References

External links

106.1 WNGC-FM official website

NGC
Country radio stations in the United States
Radio stations established in 1948
Cox Media Group